Vanvikan is a village in the municipality of Indre Fosen in Trøndelag county, Norway. It is located along the Trondheimsfjord in the southeastern part of the municipality. One of the schools in the municipality, Vanvikan Skole is located in the village of Vanvikan. Stranda Church is also located in the village.

The village is an industrial centre with the various technology industries that are part of Lyng Industrier. Vanvikan is connected to the city of Trondheim by means of a fast passenger boat route across the Trondheimsfjord. The Norwegian County Road 755 connects it with other villages to the northeast.

References

External links

Indre Fosen
Villages in Trøndelag